The Pitch and Putt World Cup is the Teams championship promoted by the Federation of International Pitch and Putt Associations (FIPPA) played every four years.

World championships

External links
 FIPPA Federation of International Pitch and Putt Associations
 2006 World Cup
 Results and statistics of all World Cups

Pitch and putt competitions
Pitch and putt
World cups
Quadrennial sporting events